ZFK Minsk is a Belarusian women's football team based in Minsk. It plays its home matches at the FC Minsk Stadium.

History
It originally competed in the Belarusian Premier League as Minchanka-BGPU before becoming the women's section of FC Minsk in 2010. In 2011, it won the national cup, its first title, and soon afterwards it rose to the championship's top positions.

In 2013, it won the championship for the first time, winning all 26 games, along with its second Cup. This qualified the team for UEFA Women's Champions League for the first time.

In 2014, the club succeeded in achieving the double again.

Honours
Belarusian Premier League: 
 Winners (7): 2013, 2014, 2015, 2016, 2017, 2018, 2019
Belarusian Women's Cup:
 Winners (8): 2011, 2013, 2014, 2015, 2016, 2017, 2018, 2019,
Belarusian Women's Super Cup:
 Winners (6): 2014, 2015, 2016, 2018, 2019, 2020,

Current squad

Out on Loan

Former Players
For details of current and former players, see :Category:FC Minsk (women) players.

UEFA Women's Champions League record

References

Women's football clubs in Belarus
Football clubs in Minsk